Bunker Hill, Bunkers Hill or Bunker's Hill may refer to:

Massachusetts, U.S.
Bunker Hill, after which the Battle of Bunker Hill was named, a hill in the Boston neighborhood of Charlestown
 Battle of Bunker Hill, a 1775 American Revolutionary War battle fought near the hill
 USS Bunker Hill (CV-17), an Essex-class aircraft carrier
 USS Bunker Hill (CG-52), a Ticonderoga-class cruiser
 Bunker Hill Community College, a college in Charlestown, Boston

Other places in the U.S.
 Bunker Hill, Los Angeles, California, a district in downtown Los Angeles
 Bunker Hill, Illinois
 Bunker Hill Township, Macoupin County, Illinois
 Bunker Hill, Indiana, a town in Miami County
 Grissom Joint Air Reserve Base or Bunker Hill Air Force Base
 Bunker Hill, Fayette County, Indiana
 Bunker Hill, Morgan County, Indiana
 Bunker Hill, Kansas
 Bunker Hill (Millersville, Maryland)
 Bunker Hill Township, Michigan
 Bunker Hill, Howard County, Missouri
 Bunker Hill, Lewis County, Missouri
 Bunker Hill, Stoddard County, Missouri
 Bunker Hill (Nevada), a mountain in the Toiyabe Range
 Bunker Hill, Oregon
 Bunker Hill, Tennessee
 Bunker Hill, Washington
 Bunker Hill, West Virginia
 Bunker Hill, Wisconsin

Places in Australia
Bunkers Hill, Victoria, location near Ballarat, Australia

Places in England

Bunkers Hill, Cambridgeshire, a location in England 
Bunkers Hill, Greater Manchester, a location in England
Bunkers Hill, Lincolnshire, a location in England
Bunkers Hill, Norfolk, a location in England
Bunker's Hill, Nottingham, location of St Stephen's Church, Bunker's Hill
Bunkers Hill, Oxfordshire, a location in EnglandK 
Bunkers Hill, Suffolk, a location in England 
 Bunker's Hill, Wolverhampton, an area of Wolverhampton, England

Other uses
 Bunker Hill (film), a film by Kevin Willmott
 Bunker Hill (musician), American R&B and gospel singer
 Bunker Hill (song), a 2003 song by the Red Hot Chili Peppers
 Bunker Hill Historic District
 "Bunker Hill" (Supergirl), an episode of Supergirl
The Death of General Warren at the Battle of Bunker's Hill, June 17, 1775, painting

See also
 Bunker Hill Covered Bridge
Bunker Hill Military Academy
 Bunker Hill Mine and Smelting Complex
 Bunker Hill Monument
 Bunker Hill School
 Bunker Hill House, a National Register of Historic Places listing in Preble County, Ohio
 Pure Genius, an American medical drama television series originally titled Bunker Hill